The 1950 NCAA Wrestling Championships were the 20th NCAA Wrestling Championships to be held. Iowa State Teachers College in Cedar Falls, Iowa hosted the tournament at their West Gymnasium.

Iowa State Teachers College took home the team championship with 30 points and having three individual champions.

Tony Gizoni of Waynesburg was named the Outstanding Wrestler.

Team results

Individual finals

References 

NCAA Division I Wrestling Championship
Wrestling competitions in the United States
NCAA Wrestling Championships
NCAA Wrestling Championships
NCAA Wrestling Championships